Modhonogor or Madhyanagar is an upazila in Sunamganj district in Bangladesh About 1.5 lakh people live in 4 unions of the upazila. The second largest haor of Bangladesh, the third Ramsar area is located at Banshikunda of Brihaur in Madhyanagar upazila of Tanguar haor.

Geography
Meghalaya in India on the north, Dharampasha upazila on the south, Tahirpur upazila on the east and Kalmakanda upazila on the west.

History
Madhyanagar Thana was formed in 1984 with Madhyanagar Union, Chamardani Union, Banshikunda North Union and Banshikunda South Union. The distance from Banshikunda North Union to Upazila Sadar is more than 40 kilometers, on the other hand the distance from Upazila Sadar to Madhyanagar is 20 kilometers. As a result, people were suffering to get education, medical and administrative services.

Initially, activities were started from mid-1986 to upgrade Madhyanagar Thana to an upazila. After this, programs like hunger strike, human chain and hartal were also observed in Madhyanagar market at different times. At the 7th meeting of the National Implementation Committee on Administrative Restructuring (NICAR) in 2001, it was decided to establish Madhyanagar Upazila with 4 unions in Madhyanagar Thana area. The decision was later overturned at the 7th Nikar meeting. The last decision to make Madhyanagar a full-fledged upazila was taken at the 116th meeting of Nikar on 28 July 2021.

Administration
Administrative activities of 4 unions are under Madhyanagar upazila.
 Banshikunda Uttar Union
 Banshikunda Dakkhin Union
 Chamradani Union
 Madhyanagar Union

Economy
The amount of agricultural land in this upazila is 15,600 hectares.

See also
Upazilas of Bangladesh
Districts of Bangladesh
Divisions of Bangladesh

References

Upazilas of Sunamganj District